Anthidium flavorufum is a species of bee in the family Megachilidae, the leaf-cutter, carder, or mason bees.

References

flavorufum
Insects described in 1981